Hosea 12 is the twelfth chapter of the Book of Hosea in the Hebrew Bible or the Old Testament of the Christian Bible. This chapter contains the prophecies attributed to the prophet Hosea son of Beeri, and was delivered about the time of Israel's seeking the aid of the Egyptian king So, in violation of their covenant with Assyria (Hosea 12:1). He exhorts them to follow their father Jacob's persevering prayerfulness, which brought God's favor upon him. As God is unchangeable, He will show the same favor to Jacob's posterity as He did to Jacob, if, like him, they seek God. It is a part of the Book of the Twelve Minor Prophets.

Text 
The original text was written in Hebrew language. This chapter is divided into 14 verses in Christian Bibles, but 15 verses in the Hebrew Bible with the following verse numbering comparison:

This article generally follows the common numbering in Christian English Bible versions, with notes to the numbering in Hebrew Bible versions.

Textual witnesses
Some early manuscripts containing the text of this chapter in Hebrew are of the Masoretic Text tradition, which includes the Codex Cairensis (895), the Petersburg Codex of the Prophets (916), Aleppo Codex (10th century), Codex Leningradensis (1008). Fragments cumulatively containing all verses of this chapter in Hebrew were found among the Dead Sea Scrolls, including 4Q82 (4QXIIg; 25 BCE) with extant verses 1–14 (verses 1–15 in Masoretic Text).

There is also a translation into Koine Greek known as the Septuagint, made in the last few centuries BCE. Extant ancient manuscripts of the Septuagint version include Codex Vaticanus (B; B; 4th century), Codex Alexandrinus (A; A; 5th century) and Codex Marchalianus (Q; Q; 6th century).

Verse 1
"Ephraim feeds on the wind,
And pursues the east wind;
He daily increases lies and desolation.
Also they make a covenant with the Assyrians,
And oil is carried to Egypt.
 "East wind": in Palestine is coming from Arabia and the Far East, over large sandy area, scorching, destructive to vegetation , and also having the force of the whirlwind (cf. ).
 "Oil is carried into Egypt": referring to rich and precious oils to procure friendship, which is forbidden by God.

Verse 9
 And I that am the Lord thy God from the land of Egypt
will yet make thee to dwell in tabernacles,
 as in the days of the solemn feast.
This verse consists of two parts which in the original are coordinated. It is better to translate thus: 
 And I am the Lord thy God, from the land of Egypt:
 I will yet make thee to dwell in tabernacles,
 as in the days of the solemn feast.
 "Dwell in tabernacles": Kimchi interprets this as a promise, perhaps with an implied threatening, that even so God is ready to bring Israel forth out of the captivity where they will be, as God brought Israel forth out of the land of Egypt, and made them dwell in tents in the wilderness, God is ready again to bring Israel forth out of the lands of the Gentiles, to cause them to dwell in tents in the wilderness along the way, until they shall return to their land in peace." 
 "As in the days of the solemn feast": alluding to the feast of tabernacles, which commemorates the Israelites dwelling in tents in the wilderness, which may refer to Jesus Christ's incarnation, expressed as 'his tabernacling' among men in human nature (John 1:14; cf. ).

Verse 12
  And Jacob fled into the country of Syria,
 and Israel served for a wife,
 and for a wife he kept sheep.
 "Country of Syria": or "field of Syria" the same with "Padan-Aram" ("Padan" means "field" in Arabic and "Aram" is Syria), the place to where Jacob fled from his brother Esau.
 "Israel served for a wife, and for a wife he kept sheep": refers to the period Jacob spent as a shepherd for Laban, his uncle, to marry his two wives, Leah and Rachel, Laban's daughters, each for seven years.

Verse 13
And by a prophet the Lord brought Israel out of Egypt,
and by a prophet was he preserved.
 "By a prophet" denotes Moses.
 "Preserved": or "kept"; there is an allusion to the same Hebrew word in Hosea 12:12, "kept sheep"; Israel was kept by God as His flock, even as Jacob kept sheep.

See also

 Assyria
 Gilead
 Gilgal
 Egypt
 Ephraim
 Jacob
 Israel
 Syria

Related Bible parts: Genesis 25, Genesis 28, Genesis 29, Genesis 32, Genesis 35, Exodus 14, Jeremiah 7, Hosea 6, Hosea 7, Hosea 8, Hosea 9, Hosea 10

Notes

References

Sources

External links

Jewish
Hosea 12 Hebrew with Parallel English
Hosea 12 Hebrew with Rashi's Commentary

Christian
Hosea 12 English Translation with Parallel Latin Vulgate

12